Garðarsson is an Icelandic patronymic surname, literally meaning "son of Garðar". Notable people with the name include:

 Finnur Garðarsson (born 1952), Icelandic swimmer
 Gísli Örn Garðarsson (born 1973), Icelandic actor and director
 Sverrir Garðarsson (born 1984), Icelandic footballer

Icelandic-language surnames